Sarah "Sarie" Bezuidenhout-Coltman (born 18 February 1945) is a Zimbabwean diver. She competed in two events at the 1964 Summer Olympics.

References

External links
 

1945 births
Living people
Zimbabwean female divers
Olympic divers of Rhodesia
Divers at the 1964 Summer Olympics
Place of birth missing (living people)